WTTC may refer to:

 World Travel and Tourism Council
 WTTC-FM, a radio station (95.3 FM) licensed to serve Towanda, Pennsylvania, United States
 WTXW, a radio station (1550 AM) licensed to serve Towanda, Pennsylvania, which held the call sign WTTC from 1960 to 2022
 Women's Tag Team Championship
 World Tag Team Championship (WWE), a professional wrestling championship
 World Table Tennis Championships